Emanuele Guidi (born September 16, 1969) is a Sammarinese professional archer. He represented San Marino at the 2012 Summer Olympics where he finished 64th in the Men's individual. At the time of the 2012 games, Guidi ranked 394th in the world.

References

Living people
Sammarinese male archers
Olympic archers of San Marino
Archers at the 2012 Summer Olympics
1969 births
Archers at the 2015 European Games
European Games competitors for San Marino